Vichigasta is a municipality and village within the Chilecito Department of La Rioja Province in northwestern Argentina. It is situated immediately east of the smaller village of Colonia Vichigasta.

References

Populated places in La Rioja Province, Argentina